Downtown Science may refer to:

 Downtown Science (group), a short-lived hip hop music group
 Downtown Science (Downtown Science album), 1991
 Downtown Science (Blockhead album), 2005